James Moir (1900 – 11 February 1961) was a Canadian soccer player who played as a defender for Toronto Ulster United and for Canada.

Career 
Moir was born in Edinburgh, Scotland, and moved to Toronto, Canada in 1913. He played with Linfield Rovers junior team, and later with Toronto All Scots. He played with Toronto Ulster United in the Inter-City League and later in the National Soccer League. Throughout his tenure with Toronto he would secure the Challenge Trophy in 1925, and was named the tournament's MVP. In 1932, he participated in the NSL Championship final where Toronto defeated Montreal Carsteel for the title.

He died on February 11, 1961, in Toronto from coronary thrombosis. In 2017, he was inducted into the Canada Soccer Hall of Fame.

International career 
Moir made his debut for the Canada men's national soccer team on November 8, 1925, against the United States in a friendly match.

References

External links
 / Canada Soccer Hall of Fame

1900 births
1961 deaths
Canada men's international soccer players
Canadian soccer players
Toronto Ulster United players
Canadian National Soccer League players
Footballers from Edinburgh
British emigrants to Canada
Canada Soccer Hall of Fame inductees
Association football forwards